Mushavan (formerly known as Tsornatap, Shorbulakh and Mushakan), is a neighbourhood in the Erebuni District of the Armenian capital Yerevan.

References 

Populated places in Yerevan